Crataegus songarica is an Asian species of hawthorn with black fruit that is sometimes used medicinally. It is closely related to Crataegus ambigua, a species that has red fruit.

Distribution and ecology 
The native range of the species covers much of Central Asia and Xinjiang. It grows on limestone or granite, at elevations of 800–2700 m.

Description 
The plant is a tree or small shrub with thorns up to 15 mm in length. The white flowers have 18-20 stamens with purple anthers, and occur in groups of 10–20. The fruit is 6–14 mm in diameter, slightly longer than wide, purplish-black with 1–3 stones (usually 2).

See also 
 List of hawthorn species with black fruit

References

songarica
Flora of Central Asia
Flora of China
Medicinal plants of Asia